AdHouse Books was an independent comic book publisher based in Richmond, Virginia. It was founded in 2002 by graphic designer Chris Pitzer. 

AdHouse was known primarily as a publisher of graphic novels, beginning with 2002's Pulpatoon: Pilgrimage, traditional comic book series, and art books, including James Jean's Process Recess;

The company announced on July 14th 2021 that it would cease publications after its 101st book. The company would then take 2022 to visit as many shows, conventions, festivals, etc., as they could. Among the reasons, Pitzer mentioned his older age, as well as "low sales on recent releases, uneasiness about the crowdfunding model, and the lack of conventions due to the COVID-19 pandemic."

Graphic novels and single issue comics

 Superior Showcase (2005 - 2008) anthology, by Dean Trippe, Nick Bertozzi, Mike Dawson, and Hope Larson (4 issues)
 Zig Zag (2005–2007) by J. Chris Campbell (2 issues)
 Project: Romantic (2006) Anthology, edited by Chris Pitzer
 Bumperboy and the Loud, Loud Mountain (2006) by Debbie Huey
 Noble Boy (2006) by Scott Morse, published by Red Window and distributed by AdHouse Books
 The Preposterous Adventures of IronHide Tom (2006) by Joel Priddy
 Project: Superior (2005) Anthology, edited by Chris Pitzer, Dean Haspiel and Scott Morse
 Mort Grim (2005) by Doug Fraser
 Bumperboy Loses His Marbles (2005) by Debbie Huey, distributed by AdHouse Books
 Salamander Dream (2005) by Hope Larson
 The Secret Voice (2005) by Zack Soto (1 issue)
 The Collected Sequential (2004) by Paul Hornschemeier
 Return of the Elephant (2004) by Paul Hornschemeier
 One Step After Another (2004) by Fermin Solis
 FREE Comic Book Day Comic Book 2004 (2004) by Scott Morse, Joel Priddy, and Chris Pitzer
 Southpaw (2004) by Scott Morse
 Monkey & Spoon (2004) by Simone Lia
 Project: Telstar (2004) Anthology, edited by Chris Pitzer
 Skyscrapers of the Midwest (2004) by Joshua W. Cotter (4 issues)
 My Own Little Empire (2003) by Scott Mills
 Pulpatoon Pilgrimage (2002) by Joel Priddy

Art books
 Blue Collar / White Collar by Sterling Hundley
Pink, Vol. 1: GRRR! (2004) by Scott Morse
 Process Recess (2005) by James Jean
Process Recess 2: Portfolio (2007) by James Jean
Process Recess 3 (2009) by James Jean

Awards
In 2004, AdHouse's Project: Telstar received Domtar Paper's Kudos Award for Excellence. The anthology was also nominated for several other awards, including Best Anthology and Special Award for Excellence in Presentation by the Harvey Awards, and Best Anthology and Best Publication Design by the Eisner Awards. 

AdHouse's first publication, Pulpatoon Pilgrimage, won the 2002 Small Press Expo Ignatz Award for Outstanding Debut and the 2002 Ninth Art Lighthouse Award for Debut Book, and was nominated for a 2003 Eisner Award for Best Graphic Novel.

References

External links
  AdHouse Books official website
 2008 podcast interview with Peter Semeti and Chris Pitzer at comiXology
 2006 Newsarama Interview 
  2006 Graphic Language Interview
2008 Comics Reporter Holiday Interview

Comic book publishing companies of the United States
Publishing companies established in 2002
2002 establishments in Virginia